Victor Borja Hocog (born September 11, 1953) is a Northern Marianan politician. He served as the President of the Northern Mariana Islands Senate from January 14, 2019 to January 11, 2021, and previously from January 12, 2015 to December 29, 2015. He also served as the 11th Lieutenant Governor of the Northern Mariana Islands from December 29, 2015 to January 14, 2019.

Background and personal life 
Hocog lives in Rota with his wife, Villa M. Hocog.

In 2013, the Northern Mariana Islands Superior Court found Hocog and his wife Villa liable for unpaid rent on a piece of land on Rota. The Hocogs had not paid rent since 2009. The Hocogs were order to $292,049 in overdue rent, interest, and attorney's costs.

Political career 
Hocog unsuccessfully ran against Prudencio T. Manglona for mayor of Rota in November 1989. Hocog also ran for mayor of Rota in 2005 and 2009.

Commonwealth Legislature 
In 2008, Hocog advocated in favor of a bill to require the Commonwealth Utilities Corporation to sell its power system for $250 million. The bill prohibited requests for proposal in the procurement process in order to prevent protests. Governor Benigno Fitial vetoed the bill, saying it could lead to higher utility rates because the private company that would buy the power system would recover its selling cost by passing them on to utility consumers. Hocog was one of many in the House of Representatives who successfully overrode the governor's veto.

In 2008, Hocog supported a bill that would allow certain foreign workers to apply for a resident foreign national entry permit. The bill would make a foreign worker eligible if the individual had lived legally in the Northern Marianas Islands for at least five years and has good character.

In 2009, Hocog introduced a bill to establish a set of procedures to seize land from private individuals in order to build a public highway.

Hocog supported a bill to legalize casino gaming in Saipan in 2012. The bill did not advance past the Senate.

In 2015, Hocog sponsored a bill to establish the crime of electronic impersonation. The bill would make it a crime to hack someone's profile on the internet or to create a fake profile on the internet with the intent to harm, intimidate, or attack other people.

Lieutenant Governor 
Incumbent Governor Eloy Inos died of complications after open heart surgery on December 28, 2015. In accordance with the Constitution of the Northern Mariana Islands, Lieutenant Governor of the Northern Mariana Islands Ralph Torres became the Governor of the Northern Mariana Islands and Hocog became lieutenant governor. Hocog was sworn in as lieutenant governor on December 29, 2015. Hocog announced in November 2017 that he would not seek re-election in 2018, and would instead seek to return to the Senate.

See also 
Lieutenant Governor of the Northern Mariana Islands

References

|-

|-

1953 births
21st-century American politicians
Chamorro people
Lieutenant Governors of the Northern Mariana Islands
Living people
Members of the Northern Mariana Islands House of Representatives
People from Rota (island)
Presidents of the Northern Mariana Islands Senate
Republican Party (Northern Mariana Islands) politicians